Nikolay Andreevich Veryovkin-Rakhalsky (1893–1984) was a Soviet general. He fought in the Imperial Russian Army during World War I before going over to the Bolsheviks in the subsequent civil war. He was promoted to Komkor (corps commander) in 1939. He was a recipient of the Order of Lenin, the Order of the Red Banner, the Order of Kutuzov, the Order of the Red Star, the Order of the October Revolution and the Order of Bogdan Khmelnitsky (Soviet Union). He was a member of the Communist Party of the Soviet Union. He retired in 1958 at the age of 65.

External links
 Биография Н. А. Веревкина-Рахальского на сайте «Генералы» (на англ. яз.)

1893 births
1984 deaths
Russian military personnel of World War I
People of the Russian Civil War
Soviet military personnel of World War II
Soviet lieutenant generals
Recipients of the Order of Lenin
Recipients of the Order of the Red Banner
Recipients of the Order of Kutuzov, 2nd class
Recipients of the Order of Bogdan Khmelnitsky (Soviet Union), 1st class
Communist Party of the Soviet Union members
Commandants of the Frunze Military Academy